Five Days, Five Nights may refer to:

 Five Days, Five Nights (novel), a novel by Álvaro Cunhal
 Five Days, Five Nights (1960 film)
 Five Days, Five Nights (1996 film)